Keira Breeanne Robinson (born December 20, 1994) is an American professional basketball player. In 2020 she was named the Icelandic Cup Finals MVP after leading Skallagrímur to its first ever Icelandic Cup win.

High school
Robinson played attended W. J. Keenan High School in Columbia, South Carolina. During her senior season, she averaged 20.1 points, 5.1 assists and 6.0 steals per game.

College career
From 2013 to 2017, Robinson played college basketball for the VCU Rams. She was the second player in the schools history to reach 1,000 points, 400 assists and 200 steals.

Professional career
After playing in Spain and Argentina, Robinson signed with Skallagrímur of the Icelandic Úrvalsdeild kvenna in September 2019. She starred during the final-four of the Icelandic Cup, scoring 44 points in the semi-finals against Haukar and 32 points in the finals against KR, leading Skallagrímur to its first ever win in the Cup. For her performance, she was named the Cup Finals MVP. In the Úrvalsdeild, she averaged 24.1 points, 8.6 rebounds and 5.2 assists per game and led Skallagrímur to a 4th place finish before the rest of the season was canceled in March 2020 due to the coronavirus pandemic in Iceland. A month later, she signed a re-signed with the club for the 2020–21 season.

On 20 September 2020, she won the Icelandic Super Cup after scoring a team high 21 points when Skallagrímur defeated Valur 74–68.

In 2021, she signed with Spanish club UCAM Murcia CB. She left the team in December 2021, after averaging 6.0 points, 4.0 assists and 2.1 assists in 14 league games, and returned to Iceland where she signed with Haukar, replacing the recently departed Haiden Palmer. In her debut, she shad 27 points and 9 rebounds in a victory against Breiðablik. On 19 March 2022, she won the Icelandic Cup for the second time after Haukar defeated Breiðablik in the 2022 Cup Finals. In April 2022, she signed a 2-year contract extension with the club.

On 14 January 2023, she posted 22 points, 12 rebounds and 5 assists in Haukar's 94–66 win against Keflavík in the Icelandic Cup final.

Statistics

College statistics

Source

References

External links
Icelandic statistics at Icelandic Basketball Association
Spanish statistics at competiciones.feb.es
VCU Rams bio
Eurobasket.com profile

1994 births
Living people
American expatriate basketball people in Argentina
American expatriate basketball people in Iceland
American expatriate basketball people in Spain
American women's basketball players
CB Murcia players
Haukar women's basketball players
Point guards
Skallagrímur women's basketball players
Úrvalsdeild kvenna basketball players
VCU Rams women's basketball players